Þórhallur Dan Jóhannsson (born 5 December 1972) is a retired Icelandic football defender.

References

1972 births
Living people
Thorhallur Johannsson
Thorhallur Johannsson
Thorhallur Johannsson
Vejle Boldklub players
Thorhallur Johannsson
Thorhallur Johannsson
Association football defenders
Thorhallur Johannsson
Thorhallur Johannsson
Expatriate men's footballers in Denmark
Icelandic expatriate sportspeople in Denmark